The 1919–20 SK Rapid Wien season was the 22nd season in club history.

Squad

Squad and statistics

Squad statistics

Fixtures and results

League

Cup

References

1919-20 Rapid Wien Season
Rapid
Austrian football championship-winning seasons